Sondrio is a station on Line 3 of the Milan Metro which opened on 12 May 1991, more than a year after the opening of the original trunk of the line, as a one-station extension from Centrale. It was the final stop on the line until 1995, when Zara (Milan Metro) was opened.

The station is located on Via Melchiorre Gioia at the intersection with Viale Sondrio, in the municipality of Milan.

The station is underground, built in a single tunnel with two trucks, and is sometimes flooded.

References

Line 3 (Milan Metro) stations
Railway stations opened in 1991
1991 establishments in Italy
Railway stations in Italy opened in the 20th century